Diane Gashumba MD, MMed (Pediatrics), is a Rwandan pediatrician, medical administrator, politician, diplomat and Rwandan Ambassador-designate to the Kingdom of Sweden since June 12, 2021. She served as Minister of Health in the cabinet of Prime Minister Edouard Ngirente. She was appointed to that position on 4 October 2016.

Before that, from 26 March 2016 until 4 October 2016, Gashumba served as the Cabinet Minister of Gender and Family Promotion in the cabinet of Prime Minister Anastase Murekezi.

Background and education
Gashumba holds a Doctor of Medicine (MD) and a Master of Medicine (MMed), specializing in Pediatrics.

Career
According to the website of the Rwandan ministry of health, Gashumba had been practicing medicine for 17 years as of 2016. For  a period of three years she served as the medical director of Kibagabaga Hospital and Muhima Hospitals. Between 2010 and 2016, she worked with a USAID-funded child and maternal health project as "Senior Team Leader" for quality and as "Deputy Chief of Party" The $57.3 million project covered 23 of Rwanda's 30 districts.

Since 2018, Gashumba has been serving on the joint World Bank/WHO Global Preparedness Monitoring Board (GPMB), co-chaired by Elhadj As Sy and Gro Harlem Brundtland.

Other activities
 RBM Partnership to End Malaria, Member of the Board (since 2019)

See also
 Parliament of Rwanda
 Ministry of Health (Rwanda)

References

External links
Website of the Rwanda Ministry of Health

Living people
Rwandan pediatricians
21st-century Rwandan politicians
Women government ministers of Rwanda
21st-century Rwandan women politicians
Members of the Parliament of Rwanda
Family ministers of Rwanda
Health ministers of Rwanda
Year of birth missing (living people)